Crystal Palace circuit is a former motor racing circuit in Crystal Palace Park in the Crystal Palace area of south London, England. The route of the track is still largely extant but the roads are now mainly used for access to the Crystal Palace National Sports Centre located in the park, and to events within the upper parts of Crystal Palace Park. Some parts of the track are closed off but part is used for an annual Sprint Meeting held on the Spring Bank Holiday weekend, until 2017, when it was held on the August holiday weekend.

History 
The circuit opened in 1927 and the first race, for motorcycles, was on 21 May 1927. The surface had tarmac-covered bends, but the straights only had hard-packed gravel.

Later that year, during the International Imperial Trophy meeting also won by Bira, the BBC broadcast the first ever televised motor racing.

With the outbreak of World War II, the park was taken over by the Ministry of Defence, and it would not be until 1953 that race meetings could take place again. A variety of races took place, including sports cars, Formula Three, the London Trophy for Formula Two, and non-championship Formula One races.

Average speeds continued to rise over the years, with the first  lap average set in 1970 by that year's Formula One world champion, Jochen Rindt. Also in 1970, the injunction limiting race days expired and racing was increased to 14 days a year. Expensive improvements were undertaken, but it was not enough to save the circuit.

The final meeting was held on 23 September 1972, but club events still continued until the circuit's final closure in 1974.

Other uses 

The circuit's location within Greater London made it a popular venue for both film and television settings, The Italian Job filmed on the startline at Crystal Palace for the scene showing initial testing of the Mini Cooper getaway cars and in the paddock area for the scene where a security van is "blown-up". The Crystal Palace transmitter tower can be seen in the background of this scene. The circuit was also used in Ron Howard's film Rush, to recreate the last corner accident between James Hunt and Dave Morgan, and for parts of the UFO episode "The Responsibility Seat".

The first known contemporary motion picture having captured the postwar Crystal Palace circuit is Joseph Losey's 1957 film noir classic, Time Without Pity, featuring driver Leo McKern lapping in a Mercedes 300 SL coupé.

Although the circuit no longer exists (as an actual racing circuit), it can be driven virtually in the Grand Prix Legends historical motor racing computer simulation game, for which it was recreated in detail. It was later converted to several other racing simulation programs, including the popular rFactor.

The circuit was used for the prologue time trial of the Tour of Britain cycle race on 9 September 2007, and is used regularly for summer road race league events, normally held on Tuesday evenings.

Racing today 

In 1997, the Sevenoaks & District Motor Club started a series of sprint events. The event was attended by some of the star drivers and cars from the past; Bentleys, Bugattis, Ferraris, Porsches, Jaguars and many Lotuses raced the circuit once more. The latter marque even chose one of these Palace events to reveal its latest sports car. The events lasted three years before being stopped due to park development work. Following discussions with local council and the London Development Agency, sprint racing again started at the park, with the two-day event held 30/31 May 2010. This event was repeated on the same or adjacent weekend each year, until 2017, when it was held on the August Bank Holiday weekend. The event was suspended in 2018 but took place in May 2019. It was scheduled to take place again in May 2020 but was cancelled due to the COVID-19 pandemic. The event was also suspended in 2021 and 2022.

Lap records 
The official race lap records at Crystal Palace circuit are listed as:

See also 
 Crystal Palace National Sports Centre
 Herne Hill Velodrome
 Hillingdon Cycle Circuit
 Redbridge Cycling Centre

Notes

References

External links 
For 1969 circuit plan, and brief history of the circuit
For circuit plan, and photo tour of circuit
Detailed history of motor racing at Crystal Palace
Postwar history of the circuit
LRCC official web site
MotorSport at the Palace website

Crystal Palace, London
Motorsport venues in England
Sports venues in London
Demolished buildings and structures in London